Alfred Ravenscroft Kennedy (1879-1943) was a Conservative Member of Parliament for the United Kingdom House of Commons constituency of Preston who later became a County Court judge.

During his time in Parliament he asked if a Bill supporting rural properties could be introduced. He studied at Eton College and called to the Bar in 1903.

He was employed as a legal adviser to the Foreign and Commonwealth Office.

References

External links
 

1879 births
1943 deaths
People educated at Eton College
Conservative Party (UK) MPs for English constituencies
UK MPs 1924–1929
20th-century English judges
County Court judges (England and Wales)